Ronaldo Wilkins (born 30 December 1999) is a Ni-Vanuatu footballer who plays as a midfielder for Erakor Golden Star in the Port Vila Football League and the Vanuatu national football team.

Club career
Wilkins grew up in Tagabe, an area in Port Vila, the capital of Vanuatu. When he was 6-years-old he start playing at Wan Smol Bag Futsal. After a few years he moved to New Caledonia when he joined the Zimako Football Academy. In 2014 he returned to Vanuatu to start his senior career with Shepherds United. After he had played at the 2014 Summer Youth Olympics he joined the academy of New Zealand professional club Wellington Phoenix. After two years he returned to Vanuatu and went to play for Sia-Raga. On 16 October 2017 it was announced by Vanuatu Football Federation President Lambert Maltock that Wilkins would have a two-week trial at the academy of Brazilian football giants São Paulo. The trial began on 4 November and was arranged by Giovani Fernandez who is a football developer for the Oceania Football Confederation.

International career

U17 
On 13 January 2015 Wilkins made his debut for the Vanuatu U17 National Team during the 2015 OFC U-17 Championship. He scored 4 goals in 6 matches, being instrumental in Vanuatu's road to the third place in this championship.

U20 
In September 2016 he played the 2016 OFC U-20 Championship helping Vanuatu to qualify for the 2017 FIFA U-20 World Cup.

First Team 
Wilkins debuted for Vanuatu national football team on 2 December 2017.

Honours

National Team
OFC U-20 Championship : 2016

References

External links
 

Living people
1999 births
Association football midfielders
Vanuatu international footballers
Vanuatuan footballers
People from Tafea Province
Erakor Golden Star F.C. players
Vanuatu youth international footballers
Vanuatu under-20 international footballers
Sia-Raga F.C. players